Agrobacterium albertimagni is a species of arsenite-oxidizing bacterium.

References

Further reading

External links

LPSN

Rhizobiaceae
Bacteria described in 2002